Wendy Waldman (born November 29, 1950) is an American singer, songwriter, and record producer.

Biography

Early life
Waldman (born Wendy Steiner) grew up in the Los Angeles area. She was raised in a musical environment: her father Fred Steiner was a composer who wrote the theme music for Perry Mason and The Rocky and Bullwinkle Show. Her mother was a professional violinist. In 1969 she married her first husband Ken Waldman, and changed her name to Wendy Waldman.

Bryndle
Waldman's first recordings were made in 1970 as a part of Bryndle. Other group members included Karla Bonoff, Andrew Gold, and Kenny Edwards. When the group disbanded, she signed with Warner Bros. Records. Bryndle re-formed in the early 1990s and released two albums before disbanding again in the mid 2000s.

Recordings
In 1973, she released her first album Love Has Got Me, and Rolling Stone named her "singer-songwriter debut of the year." Also in 1973, Maria Muldaur covered two songs written by Waldman on her self-titled first album.

She followed her debut album with Gypsy Symphony in 1974, Wendy Waldman in 1975, The Main Refrain (1976), and Strange Company in 1978.

In 1982, Waldman released Which Way to Main Street, which featured Peter Frampton on guitar.

Songwriting
Waldman left the Warner Bros. label in 1979. In 1982 she moved to Nashville to focus on songwriting.

The songwriting team of Waldman, Phil Galdston, and Jon Lind wrote "Save the Best for Last" for Vanessa Williams, which was nominated for a Grammy. They have also written songs made popular by artists such as Madonna, Celine Dion, and Earth, Wind & Fire.

The song "Fishin' in the Dark" was written by Waldman and Jim Photoglo. It was a hit in 1987 for the Nitty Gritty Dirt Band and has also been covered by Garth Brooks and Kenny Chesney.

Production
Waldman has been one of only a few women who produce records in a male-dominated profession.

The Refugees
In 2007, Waldman formed The Refugees with Cidny Bullens and Deborah Holland.

Discography

Studio recordings
 1973: Love Has Got Me (Warner Bros.)
 1974: Gypsy Symphony (Warner Bros.)
 1975: Wendy Waldman (Warner Bros.)
 1976: The Main Refrain (Warner Bros.)
 1978: Strange Company (Warner Bros.)
 1982: Which Way to Main Street (Epic)
 1987: Letters Home (Cypress)
 1997: Environments 16 – City of Dreams (FirstCom)
 2007: My Time in the Desert (Longhouse)

Compilations
 1996: Love Is the Only Goal: The Best of Wendy Waldman (Warner Archives)
 2003: Seeds and Orphans (Longhouse)
 2009: Seeds and Orphans, Vol. 2 (Longhouse)
 2012: Back By Fall: A Retrospective (Longhouse)

Singles
 1975: "Western Lullaby" / "Green Rocky Road" (Warner Bros.)
 1976: "Living Is Good" / "The Main Refrain" (Warner Bros.)
 1978: "Long Hot Summer Nights" / "You'll See" (Warner Bros.)
 1982: "Does Anybody Want to Marry Me" (Epic)
 1982: "Heartbeat" (Epic)
 1987: "Living in Hard Times" (Cypress)

As a member of Bryndle
 1995: Bryndle (MusicMasters)
 2002: House of Silence (self-released)

As a member of the Refugees
 2009: Unbound (Wabuho)
 2012: Three (Wabuho)
 2019: How Far It Goes (Wabuho)

As composer

1973 – 1981
 1973: Maria Muldaur – Maria Muldaur (Reprise) – track 10, "Vaudeville Man"; track 11, "Mad Mad Me"
 1974: El Chicano – Cinco (MCA) – track 7, "Gringo En Mexico"
 1974: Maria Muldaur – Waitress in a Donut Shop (Reprise) – track 2, "Gringo En Mexico"
 1975: Judy Collins – Judith (Elektra) – track 11, "Pirate Ships"
 1976: Barbi Benton – Something New (Playboy) – track 11, "Thinking of You"
 1976: Maria Muldaur – Sweet Harmony (Reprise) – track 7, "Back by Fall"; track 9, "Wild Bird"
 1976: Twiggy – Twiggy (Mercury) – track 8, "Vaudeville Man"
 1980: Randy Meisner – One More Song (Epic) – track 2, "Gotta Get Away"; track 3, "Come on Back to Me"; track 5, "I Need You Bad"; track 7, "Trouble Ahead" (all songs co-written with Eric Kaz and Randy Meisner)
 1981: Kim Carnes – Mistaken Identity (EMI America) – track 6, "Break The Rules Tonite (Out of School)" (co-written with Dave Ellingson and Kim Carnes); track 7, "Still Hold On" (co-written with Dave Ellingson, Eric Kaz, and Kim Carnes)
 1981: Albert Hammond – Your World and My World (Columbia) – track 8, "Take Me Sailing"
 1981: Patti Austin – Every Home Should Have One (Qwest) – track 3, "The Way I Feel" (co-written with Eric Kaz)

1982 – present
 1982: Crystal Gayle – True Love (Elektra) – track 4, "Baby What About You" (co-written with Josh Leo)
 1982: Johnny Van Zant – The Last of the Wild Ones (Polydor) – track 4, "Still Hold On" (co-written with Dave Ellingson, Eric Kaz, and Kim Carnes)
 1983: Helen Reddy - Imagination (MCA) Side Two, track 2, "The Way I Feel" (co-written with Eric Kaz)
 1983: Helen Reddy - Imagination (MCA) Side Two, track 5, "Heartbeat" (co-written with Eric Kaz)
 1985: Kenny Rogers – Love Is What We Make It (Liberty) – track 3, "Still Hold On" (co-written with Dave Ellingson, Eric Kaz, and Kim Carnes)
 1985: Steve Wariner – Life's Highway (MCA) – track 5, "In Love And Out of Danger" (co-written with Craig Bickhardt)
 1986: The Kendalls – Fire at First Sight (MCA) – track 4, "I'll Take You (Heartache And All)" (co-written with Donnie Lowery)
 1986: Reba McEntire – Whoever's in New England (MCA) – track 1, "Can't Stop Now" (co-written with Gary Nicholson)
 1987: Don Johnson – Heartbeat (Epic) – track 1, "Heartbeat" (co-written with Eric Kaz)
 1987: Jesse Colin Young – The Highway Is For Heroes (Cypress) – track 1, "The Highway Is For Heroes" (co-written with Jesse Colin Young)
 1988: Bette Midler – Beaches (Original Soundtrack Recording) (Atlantic) – track 9, "Oh Industry" (co-written with Bette Midler)
 1988: Highway 101 – 101² (Warner Bros.) – track 2, "Road To Your Heart" (co-written with Jim Photoglo and Josh Leo)
 1988: Tuck & Patti – Tears of Joy (Windham Hill Jazz) – track 9, "Mad Mad Me"
 1991: Cher – Love Hurts (Geffen) – track 7, "One Small Step" (co-written with Barry Mann and Brad Parker)
 1993: The Hooters – Out of Body (MCA) – track 4, "Great Big American Car" (co-written with Eric Bazilian and Rob Hyman)
 2001: Alison Krauss & Union Station – New Favorite (Rounder) – track 7, "I'm Gone" (co-written with Eric Kaz)
 2008: Sonny Landreth – From the Reach (Landfall) – track 7, "The Goin' On" (co-written with Sonny Landreth)
 2009: Nicole Dillenberg – The Heart of the Matter (self-released) – track 4, "Over YouKeane"
 2010: Cindy Bullens – Howling Trains and Barking Dogs (MCD Records) – track 5, "All My Angels" (co-written with Cindy Bullens)
 2010: John Cowan – The Massenburg Sessions (e1) – track 1, "My Time in the Desert/Maggie Little" (co-written with Sally Barris and Shad Cobb)
 2015: Home Free – Country Evolution (Columbia) – track 8, "Fishing in the Dark (co-written with Jim Photoglo)

As producer
 1988: The Forester Sisters – Sincerely (Warner Bros.)
 1988: Suzy Bogguss – Somewhere Between (Capitol)
 1989: Jonathan Edwards – Natural Thing (MCA / Curb)
 1989: New Grass Revival – (Friday Night in America (Capitol)
 1990: Matraca Berg – Lying to the Moon (RCA)
 1992: Mitsou – Heading West (Tox) – track 2, "Heading West"
 1993: Rick Vincent – A Wanted Man (Curb)
 2005: Arthur Lee Land – Dragonfly (Perfect Groove)
 2007: Artie Traum – Thief of Time (Roaring Stream)
 2012: Lisa Haley – Joy Ride (Blue Fiddle)
 2014: various artists – Looking into You: A Tribute to Jackson Browne (Music Road) – track 2-04, "Something Fine"

Also appears on

1973 – 1979
 1973: Linda Ronstadt – Don't Cry Now (Asylum) – backing vocals 'Don't Cry Now'
 1974: Linda Ronstadt – Heart Like a Wheel (Capitol) – backing vocals on track 2, "It Doesn't Matter Anymore"
 1976: Maria Muldaur - Sweet Harmony (Warner Bros.) backing vocals
 1976: Al Kooper – Act Like Nothing's Wrong (United Artists) – backing vocals
 1976: Linda Ronstadt – Hasten Down the Wind (Asylum) – backing vocals
 1977: Karla Bonoff – Karla Bonoff (Columbia) – backing vocals 
 1977: Tim Moore – White Shadows (Asylum) – backing vocals
 1978: Maria Muldaur - Southern Winds (Warner Bros.) – backing vocals
 1979: Maria Muldaur - Open Your Eyes (Warner Bros.) - backing vocals
 1979: Karla Bonoff – Restless Nights (Columbia) – backing vocals

1980 – present
 1980: Bob Welch – Man Overboard (Capitol) – backing vocals
 1980: Bette Midler – In Harmony: A Sesame Street Record (Warner Bros.) – backing vocals on 'Blueberry Pie'
 1980: Amy Holland – Amy Holland (Capitol) – backing vocals
 1980: Randy Meisner – One More Song (Epic) – guitar, vocals on track 3, "Come on Back To Me"
 1980: John Stewart – Dream Babies Go Hollywood (RSO Records) – backing vocals
 1982: Karla Bonoff – Wild Heart of the Young (Columbia) – backing vocals
 1982: Nicolette Larson – All Dressed Up and No Place to Go (Warner Bros.) – backing vocals
 1983: Melissa Manchester – Emergency (Arista) – backing vocals
 1983: Randy Newman – Trouble in Paradise (Warner Bros.) – backing vocals
 1984: Jimmy Buffett – Riddles in the Sand (MCA) – backing vocals
 1984: Reba McEntire – My Kind of Country (MCA) – backing vocals
 1985: Dobie Gray – From Where I Stand (Capitol) – backing vocals
 1985: Jimmy Buffett – Last Mango in Paris (MCA) – backing vocals
 1985: Hank Williams Jr. – Five-O (Warner Bros.) – backing vocals
 1985: Rick Cua – You're My Road  (Sparrow) - vocals
 1986: Mac Davis – Somewhere in America (MCA) – vocals

References

External links 
 
 
 
 

1950 births
Living people
American women singer-songwriters
People from Greater Los Angeles
American women record producers
Record producers from California
21st-century American women